Collema coccophorum is a cyanolichen also known as soil pulp lichen or jelly lichen.  It can be found in many areas of the world, including North America, Eastern Europe and Norway, Australia, and South America. It has also been recorded in Antarctica.

References

"The lichen genus Collema in Europe: morphology, taxonomy, ecology" G Degelius - Symb. Bot. Upsal, 1954
"The lichen genus Collema with special reference to the extra-European species" G Degelius - 1974 - Uppsala Universitet, Uppsala

Peltigerales
Lichen species
Lichens described in 1862
Fungi of Australia
Fungi of North America
Fungi of Europe
Fungi of South America
Taxa named by Edward Tuckerman